Jordi Antônio Mayoral Rodríguez (born 18 May 1973 in Girona) is a retired Spanish sprinter who specialized in the 200 metres.

He finished seventh in 4 × 100 m relay at the 1997 World Championships, together with teammates Frutos Feo, Venancio José and Carlos Berlanga.

His personal best time is 20.63 seconds, achieved in July 1995 in Vitoria. He has 10.28 seconds in the 100 metres, achieved in July 1996 in Monachil.

References

1973 births
Living people
Spanish male sprinters
Athletes (track and field) at the 1996 Summer Olympics
Olympic athletes of Spain
Mediterranean Games bronze medalists for Spain
Mediterranean Games medalists in athletics
Athletes (track and field) at the 1993 Mediterranean Games